Daye is a county-level city in eastern Hubei province, China. It is under the administration of the Huangshi prefecture-level city.

As it is usually the case with county-level cities, Daye includes both an urban core and a fair amount of rural land in all directions, with smaller townships (zhen) such as Dajipu. The city is made up of 18 township-level divisions.

The Daye Lake south of Daye's urban core is surrounded by parks and fishing ponds, and is a popular place for recreation.

For a traveler who goes on G316 from Wuhan toward the south-east, Daye appears as a border between the more urban and more rural parts of the province. Daye sits on the south-eastern border of the heavily industrialized Wuhan/Ezhou/Huangshi metropolitan area; south of it, the much more rural Yangxin County begins.

Toponymy 
The city's name means "great smelter" (大冶), referencing the metal smelting which took place in the area dating back to the Tang dynasty.

History

During the Yin and Shang dynasties, the area of present-day Daye belonged to the ancient province of Jingzhou.

In 887 BCE, the area was incorporated as part of the Chu state.

It was during the Tang dynasty that historical records suggest metal smelting began in the area.

Daye gained great importance during the 1890s, when the city began producing iron en masse for the nascent Chinese railroad industry, a major hub of which was located shortly down the Yangtze River in Hankou. Despite the struggles of various mines and enterprises in Daye from the 1890s onwards through the early 20th century, Daye benefitted from its status as China's only major iron mining area. By the 1930s, this status was eroded by large-scale iron production in Japanese-occupied Manchuria.

As recently as the World War II period, Daye included much of today's prefecture-level city of Huangshi. This means that pre-1949 references to a location in "Daye" or "Tayeh" may refer to anywhere within today's Huangshi.

People's Republic of China 

Daye Prefecture was abolished in 1952, and merged into , and in 1959, Daye County was abolished and merged into the city of Huangshi. During the 1950s, the area began producing steel, and began producing much iron and steel to be used in the nearby industrial hub of Wuhan.

Daye County was re-established in June, 1962, as part of Huangshi. On February 18, 1994 the State Council approved the conversion of Daye into a county-level city, which went into effect on January 1, 1995.

Geography 
Daye is located to the north of the Mufu Mountains, and has a largely hilly terrain.

Daye is also home to many swamps, rivers, and lakes.

Climate 
Daye has a humid subtropical climate, with distinct temperature changes and dry and wet seasons.

Administrative divisions 
As of 2020, Daye administers 5 subdistricts, 10 towns, 1 township, and 2 other township-level divisions.

Subdistricts 

Towns 

Townships 

Other township-level divisions 
The city also administers the Dongfeng Farm Management Area and the Siguzha Management Department.

Demographics 
Daye's population is largely Han Chinese, with just 830 residents belonging to China's recognized ethnic minorities. These ethnic minorities comprise 27 different ethnic groups, with major ethnicities being the Tujia, Zhuang, Manchu, Miao and Hui people. In recent years, many ethnic minorities have moved to Daye seeking economic opportunities, and thus, largely reside in the city's urban areas.

Economy

Industry 

Daye is an industrial center, particularly in regards to mining and metallurgy. In addition to iron and steel industries, large amounts of copper and coal are mined in the region. Daye's coal power plants provide a major source of electricity for large cities in the region, such as Huangshi and Wuhan.

Copper mining and smelting was conducted at Daye's  as early as the Spring and Autumn period (6th century B.C.E.), if not earlier. Tonglüshan Mine is located just southwest of the modern city, and now has a museum.

Although such copper-containing minerals as malachite and azurite are found here, the local ores are richer in iron than in copper, and the modern Daye is better known for its iron ore mining and processing.

Among the major employers is Huangshi Daye Non-ferrous Metals Co., Ltd.

Daye is also home to a large fertilizer plant, and a number of textile mills which use locally grown cotton.

Agriculture 
Common crops grown in Daye include rice, wheat, sweet potato, maize, soybean, peas, mung bean, rapeseed, peanut, sesame, ramie, and cotton. Daye is also home to large amounts of domesticated animals, such as pigs, cows, sheep, dogs, chickens, ducks, geese, and pigeons.

Tourism 

Transportation

Daye was the junction of the Wuhan-Daye Railway (completed in 1958) and Daye-Shahejie Railway (completed in 1987), which merged in 1989 to form the Wuhan–Jiujiang Railway. , which is the main passenger station for the entire Huangshi metropolitan area, is located within Daye's administrative borders, about north of downtown Daye. It has fairly frequent service, with travel time to Wuhan being typically around 1 hour on a high-speed D-series train, or 1.5 hours on a "conventional" passenger train.

Daye is served by the Wuhan–Huangshi Intercity Railway, part of the future Wuhan Metropolitan Area Intercity Railway, which opened in 2014. The new Daye North Railway Station, located north-east of Daye's main urban area, serves as that line's terminal. It has fairly frequent service (about hourly) to the Wuhan Railway Station. Construction work is carried out to extent this rail line beyond Daye; this will become the Wuhan–Jiujiang Passenger Railway (estimated completion date, 2017).

Daye is also served by the China National Highway 106 (which coincides in this area with China National Highway 316).

Dialect

The speech of Daye and the adjacent counties farther south (toward the Jiangxi border) has been traditionally characterized as the Daye dialect, part of the Datong dialect group of Gan Chinese.

References

External links
 Daye City Government website 

County-level divisions of Hubei
Cities in Hubei
Huangshi
Wuhan urban agglomeration